Jabori (alternative spellings include Jaborri and Jabbori) is a sizeable village in Mansehra District in Khyber-Pakhtunkhwa, Pakistan that is surrounded by mountains. The village is also the administrative centre of Jabori Union Council. The literacy rate is growing gradually.

The population is about 30,000. The river Siran flows through the heart of the village, and the village is surrounded by mountains. A majority of the population is farmers. People belonging to the Swati, Gujjar, and Syed tribes live here.

The village is prone to natural disasters such as floods and earthquakes. In 1992, the area saw heavy floods. In October 2005, it was struck by an earthquake. Another difficulty that the local population faces is the lack of proper healthcare facilities in the area, as there are no hospitals in the region.

References

Union councils of Mansehra District